Oskar Fleischer (2 November 1856 – 8 February 1933) was a German musicologist.

Life 
Born in Zörbig Anhalt-Bitterfeld, after attending the Latin secondary school at the Francke Foundations in Halle, Fleischer studied ancient and modern languages, history of literature and philosophy at the Martin Luther University of Halle-Wittenberg from 1882 to 1886 and was promoted to Dr. phil. He then completed a four-year degree in musicology (with Philipp Spitta) in Berlin. In 1888, he took over the management of the "Royal Collection of Ancient Musical Instruments" at the Berlin University of the Arts, whose holdings he was able to expand considerably with the acquisition of Snoeck's private collection. From 1892, he worked as a "Privatdozent", and from 1895 (until 1925) as an associate professor of musicology at the Humboldt-Universität zu Berlin. Among his best-known students were the Mozart scholar Hermann Abert, Komitas Vardapet and his successor Curt Sachs.

In 1899, he was a co-founder of the International Music Society and editor of its publication organs (Sammelbände der Internationalen Musikgesellschaft, Zeitschrift der Internationalen Musikgesellschaft). His main academic field was not so much the study of musical instruments but rather the study of medieval and ancient Greek chant scales (neume genesis). In the last years of his life, he became an outsider with his attempt to reconstruct a "Germanic neume script" and published in the völkisch-national journal Die Sonne. He was a  "Geheimrat" (Privy Councillor).

Fleischer died in Berlin aged 76.

Publications 

 Das Accentuationssystem Notkers in seinem Boethius, Halle 1882 (Diss.)
 Denis Gaulthier. In VfMw 2 (1886), 
 Neumenstudien. Abhandlungen über mittelalterliche Gesangs-Tonschriften. 3 volumes., vol.I, Leipzig 1895, vol.II, Leipzig 1897, vol.III, Berlin 1904
 Königliche Hochschule für Musik zu Berlin. Führer durch die Sammlung Alter Musikinstrumente, Berlin 1892
 Die Bedeutung der internationalen Musik- und Theaterausstellung in Wien für Kunst und Wissenschaft der Musik, Leipzig 1894
 Die Reste der altgriechischen Tonkunst, Leipzig 1899
 C.F. Weitzmann: Geschichte der Klaviermusik, Leipzig 1899 (Neubearbeitung mit Max Seiffert)
 Mozart (Geisteshelden Bd. 33), Berlin 1900
 Führer durch die Bach-Ausstellung im Festsaale des Berliner Rathauses, Berlin 1901
 Zur Phonophotographie. Eine Abwehr, Berlin 1904
 Musikalische Bilder aus Deutschlands Vergangenheit, Berlin 1913
 Vom Kriege gegen die deutsche Kultur – ein Beitrag zur Selbsterkenntnis des deutschen Volkes, Berlin 1915
 Eine astronomisch-musikalische Zeichen-Schrift in neolithischer Zeit, Berlin 1915
 Die germanischen Neumen als Schlüssel zum altchristlichen und gregorianischen Gesang, Frankfurt 1923
 Vor- und frühgeschichtliche Urgründe des Volkslieds. In Die Sonne. Monatsschrift für nordische Weltanschauung und Lebensgestaltung 5 (1928).

References

Further reading 
 F. Jansa: Deutsche Tonkünstler und Musiker in Wort und Bild, 2.A., Leipzig 1911
 H. Abert: Illustriertes Musik-Lexikon, Stuttgart 1927
 A. Einstein: Oskar Fleischer [Nachruf]. In ZfMw 5(1932/33), 
 H.J. Moser: Musiklexikon, 4.A. vol. 1, Hamburg 1955.
 Dizionario di musica, Paravia 1956, 
 H. Riemann: MusikLexikon, vol. 1, Mainz 1959, 
 D.Hiley: Oskar Fleischer, in The New Grove Dictionary of Music and Musicians, London 1980, .
 W. Rathert: Oskar Fleischer, In Die Musik in Geschichte und Gegenwart, vol. 6, Kassel etc. 2001, 
 Deutsche Biographische Enzyklopädie, 2.A, vol. 3, Munich 2006,

External links 
 

19th-century German musicologists
20th-century German musicologists
Directors of museums in Germany
Academic staff of the Humboldt University of Berlin
1856 births
1933 deaths
People from Zörbig